South American Championship 1956 was a football tournament held in Uruguay, who won it. Chile were runners-up. Bolivia, Colombia, and Ecuador withdrew from the tournament. Enrique Hormazábal from Chile became top scorer of the tournament with 4 goals.

Venues

Squads

Final round

Result

Goalscorers

A total of 26 different players scored 38 goals in the tournament. None of the goals are credited as own goal.

4 Goals
  Enrique Hormazábal

3 Goals

  Guillermo Escalada
  Óscar Míguez

2 Goals

  Ángel Labruna
  Jaime Ramírez Banda
  Leonel Sánchez
  Máximo Rolón
  Roberto Drago

1 Goal

  Carlos Cecconato
  Omar Sívori
  Federico Vairo
  Álvaro
  Luizinho
  Maurinho
  Zezinho
  José Fernández
  Manuel Muñoz
  René Meléndez
  Antonio Gómez
  Isaac Andrade
  Félix Castillo
  Gómez Sánchez
  Máximo Mosquera
  Javier Ambrois
  Carlos Borges
  José Walter Roque

External links
 South American Championship 1956 at RSSSF

 
1956
Championship, 1956
1956
1956 in Uruguayan football
January 1956 sports events in South America
February 1956 sports events in South America
Sports competitions in Montevideo
1950s in Montevideo